Alexander Gabrielsen (born 18 November 1985) is a Norwegian former professional footballer who played as a defender.

Career
In 2002, Gabrielsen signed for Viking FK from Randaberg IL, for which he had been playing since he was a boy. He got his Tippeliga-debut in 2003. He played 11 Tippeliga-matches for Viking until 10 August 2007, when he signed a 3.5-year-deal with Sandefjord Fotball.

In October 2017, Gabrielsen announced his retirement from playing.

Career statistics

References

External links
 
 
 

1985 births
Living people
Sportspeople from Stavanger
Norwegian footballers
Association football defenders
Eliteserien players
Randaberg IL players
Viking FK players
Sandefjord Fotball players